TIGO El Salvador is a mobile phone service provider company owned by the international mobile phone company Millicom International Cellular or just MIC. In 2003 Telemovil changed its name to TIGO introducing its GSM Technology, new mobile phone sources, new mobile phones, more coverage, a new fresh look, and also new plans.

There are also other TIGO's in Latin America, in the Central American countries of Guatemala, Honduras, and also in the South American nations of Colombia, Paraguay, and Bolivia.

TIGO Colombia is the biggest subsidiary of TIGO in the world with a base of 3 million subscribers

In El Salvador's competitive mobile phone market TIGO's main rivals are:
 The Spanish movistar
 The Mexican Claro
 The Caribbean Digicel
 The American RED (this one does not offer GSM services. Just iDEN)

TIGO offers the following cellphone brands in El Salvador.
Alcatel
i-mate
LG
Motorola
Nokia
SAMSUNG
Siemens
Sony Ericsson
Palm Treo
VK Mobile
Tigo Money

El Salvador has access to Tigo Money, an electronic wallet that allows users to carry out transactions such as sending and receiving money, paying utility bills, remittances, making payments at different businesses, loans, and recharging Tigo packages. You can register by downloading the Tigo Money app or from the Tigo Money web https://tigomoney.com/sv/home-sv

See also
All the MIC services as Tigo in Latin America
El Salvador  TIGO SV
Guatemala TIGO GT
Honduras  TIGO HN
Colombia  TIGO CO
Paraguay  TIGO PY
Bolivia  TIGO BO

External links
TIGO El Salvador
Tigo Money El Salvador 

Mobile phone companies of El Salvador